Airamia is a monotypic moth genus of the family Noctuidae. Its only species, Airamia albiocula, is known from the US state of California. Both the genus and species were first described by William Barnes and Foster Hendrickson Benjamin, the genus in 1926 and the species in 1918.

References

 

Acontiinae
Noctuoidea genera
Monotypic moth genera